Linda Tucceri Cimini (born 4 April 1991) is an Italian professional footballer who plays as a left midfielder for Serie A club Fiorentina and the Italy women's national team.

Tucceri Cimini played for Italy at UEFA Women's Euro 2017.

International goals

References

External links
 

1991 births
Living people
Italian women's footballers
Women's association football midfielders
A.C. Milan Women players
Fiorentina Women's F.C. players
Italy women's international footballers
2019 FIFA Women's World Cup players
UEFA Women's Euro 2017 players